David E. Rutter is an American financial services executive. He is the founder and CEO of enterprise blockchain technology company R3, and the founder and owner of US Treasuries trading platform LiquidityEdge.

Career 
David E. Rutter served for ten years as the CEO of electronic broking at ICAP Plc, where he led the BrokerTec fixed income and EBS foreign exchange platforms.

Before joining ICAP Plc, he was co-owner and CEO (Americas) of Prebon Yamane. His tenure at Prebon began in 1988, after the company entered into a joint venture with the Chicago Board of Trade that led to the introduction of trading on computer screens.

In 2014 Rutter founded R3, an enterprise software firm that built the blockchain platform Corda.

Rutter founded LiquidityEdge in 2015 to provide an alternative trading model for the US Treasuries market. LiquidityEdge was acquired by MarketAxess on 1 November 2019 for $150 million, including $100 million in cash and 146,450 shares of MarketAxess stock.

In 2020 Rutter launched LedgerEdge, a new company that uses blockchain technology to digitise corporate bond trading.

Education 
David E. Rutter received a Bachelor of Science degree in Business Administration from Villanova University in 1984.

References

Living people
American financial businesspeople
Year of birth missing (living people)